Nicolas Mary, sieur Desfontaines also called Desfontaines, born c. 1610 in Rouen – died 4 February 1652 in Angers, was a 17th-century French playwright, novelist and actor.

A prolific author, Desfontaines composed 13 theatre plays including L’Illustre Comédien ou Le Martyre de Saint Genest (1645) (which was revived by Rotrou the following year), Eurymédon ou l’Illustre Pirate, (1637), Orphise ou la Beauté persécutée (1638), Hermogène (1638), Bélisaire (1641), Les Galantes vertueuses (1642), Le Martyre de Saint Eustache (1644), Saint Alexis ou l’Illustre Olympie (1644), Alcidiane ou Les Quatre Rivaux (1645), Belissante ou l’Infidélité reconnue (1647) and La Véritable Sémiramis (1647).

An enthusiastic admirer of Corneille, Desfontaines also left a sequel to his tragedy Le Cid entitled la Vraie Suite du Cid as well as a follow up to the tragedy Ibrahim Bassa by Georges de Scudéry.

Desfontaines gave three novels, les Heureuses Infortunes de Céliante et Marilinde, Veuves-Pucelles (1638), l’Illustre Amazonthe (1645) and l’Inceste innocent (1658).

Desfontaines also wrote about some religious subjects and was a translator from Italian.

Works 
 Tragédies hagiographiques, texts edited and presented by Claude Bourqui and Simone de Reyff, Paris, Société des textes français modernes,

Sources 
 Louis-Henri Baratte, Poètes normands, Paris, Lacrampe, 1845
 Théodore-Éloi Lebreton, Biographie rouennaise, Rouen, Le Brument, 1865
 Joseph-François Michaud, Louis Gabriel Michaud, Biographie universelle, ancienne et moderne, Paris, Michaud, 1813

External links 
 Nicolas Mary on data.bnf.fr
 His plays and their presentations on CÉSAR

17th-century French novelists
17th-century French male writers
17th-century French dramatists and playwrights
French translators
Italian–French translators
Writers from Rouen
Actors from Rouen
1610s births
1652 deaths
17th-century French translators